The  is a DC electric multiple unit (EMU) train operated by the private railway operator Fuji Kyuko (Fujikyu) on  limited-stop services on the Fujikyuko Line in Yamanashi Prefecture, Japan, since 23 April 2016.

Design
The three-car train was converted from the only former 371 series seven-car EMU operated by JR Central from 1991 until November 2014. The design of the rebuilt train was overseen by industrial designer Eiji Mitooka.

Operations

Formation
The sole three-car set is formed as shown below, with two motored cars and one non-powered trailer car, and car 1 at the Fujisan end.

 KuRo 8551 was converted from former KuMoHa 371-1, MoHa 8601 was converted from former MoHa 370-101, and KuMoHa 8501 was converted from former KuMoHa 371-101.
 Cars 1 and 3 are each fitted with an FPS33E single-arm pantograph.

Interior
Car 1 has an observation lounge area with 2+1 abreast seating bays and some loose seating. Car 2 has a wheelchair-accessible seating area and a universal access toilet.

History

Fuji Kyuko announced in December 2014 that it planned to purchase the 371 series trainset from JR Central, and reform it as a three-car set for use during fiscal 2015. The withdrawn 371 series train was moved from Shizuoka to JR East's Nagano Works for rebuilding work in March 2015.

The train entered service on Fujisan View Express limited-stop services from 23 April 2016.

References

External links

 Fujisan View Express 

Electric multiple units of Japan
Train-related introductions in 2016
Hitachi multiple units
Kawasaki multiple units
Nippon Sharyo multiple units
1500 V DC multiple units of Japan